Penicillium rubefaciens is a species of fungus in the genus Penicillium which has been isolated from sandy soil.

References

Further reading 
 

rubefaciens
Fungi described in 1982